Samuel Groth and Matt Reid won the first edition of the tournament 6–2, 6–4 against James Duckworth and Greg Jones.

Seeds

Draw

Draw

References 
 Main draw

Charles Sturt Adelaide International - Doubles
2013 Doubles
2013 in Australian tennis